Wilhelm Steenkamp (born ) is a South African rugby union footballer. He plays as a Lock. Later (in 2016–2017) he played for French rugby club Brive.

He is the older brother of former Stormers lock De Kock Steenkamp.

External links

Bulls profile
itsrugby.co.uk profile

1985 births
South African rugby union players
Bulls (rugby union) players
Blue Bulls players
Sharks (rugby union) players
Cheetahs (rugby union) players
Free State Cheetahs players
Western Force players
Rugby union locks
Afrikaner people
South African people of Dutch descent
People from the Western Cape
University of Pretoria alumni
Living people
Expatriate rugby union players in Australia
South African expatriates in Australia
Alumni of Paarl Boys' High School
Rugby union players from the Northern Cape